A steering wheel (also called a driving wheel (UK), a hand wheel, or simply wheel) is a type of steering control in vehicles.

Steering wheels are used in most modern land vehicles, including all mass-production automobiles, buses, light and heavy trucks, as well as tractors. The steering wheel is the part of the steering system that is manipulated by the driver; the rest of the steering system responds to such driver inputs. This can be through direct mechanical contact as in recirculating ball or rack and pinion steering gears, without or with the assistance of hydraulic power steering, HPS, or as in some modern production cars with the assistance of computer-controlled motors, known as electric power steering.

History

Near the start of the 18th century, a large number of sea vessels appeared using the ship's wheel design, but historians are unclear when that approach to steering was first used. The first automobiles were steered with a tiller, but in 1894, Alfred Vacheron took part in the Paris–Rouen race with a Panhard 4 hp model which he had fitted with a steering wheel. That is believed to be one of the earliest employments of the principle.

From 1898, the Panhard et Levassor cars were equipped as standard with steering wheels. Charles Rolls introduced the first car in Britain fitted with a steering wheel when he imported a 6 hp Panhard from France in 1898. Arthur Constantin Krebs replaced the tiller with an inclined steering wheel for the Panhard car he designed for the 1898 Paris–Amsterdam–Paris race which ran 7–13 July 1898.

In 1898, Thomas B. Jeffery and his son, Charles T. Jeffery, developed two advanced experimental cars featuring a front-mounted engine, as well as a steering wheel that was mounted on the left-hand side. However, the early automaker adopted a more "conventional" rear-engine and tiller-steering layout for its first mass-produced Ramblers in 1902. The following year, the Rambler Model E was largely unchanged, except that it came equipped with a tiller early in the year, but with a steering wheel by the end of 1903. By 1904, all Ramblers featured steering wheels. Within a decade, the steering wheel had entirely replaced the tiller in automobiles.

At the insistence of Thomas B. Jeffery, the position of the driver was also moved to the left-hand side of the car during the 1903 Rambler production. Most other car makers began offering cars with left-hand drive in 1910. Soon after, most cars in the U.S. converted to left hand drive.

Passenger cars

Steering wheels for passenger automobiles are generally circular and are mounted to the steering column by a hub connected to the outer ring of the steering wheel by one or more spokes (single spoke wheels being a rather rare exception). Other types of vehicles may use the circular design, a butterfly shape, or some other shape. In countries where cars must drive on the left side of the road, the steering wheel is typically on the right side of the car (right-hand drive or RHD); the converse applies in countries where cars drive on the right side of the road (left-hand drive or LHD).

In addition to its use in steering, the steering wheel is the usual location for a button to activate the car's horn. Modern automobiles may have other controls, such as cruise control, audio system, and telephone controls, as well as paddle-shifters, built into the steering wheel to minimize the extent to which the driver must take their hands off the wheel.

The steering wheels were rigid and mounted on non-collapsible steering columns. This arrangement increased the risk of impaling the driver in case of a severe crash. The first collapsible steering column was invented in 1934 but was never successfully marketed. By 1956, Ford came out with a safety steering wheel that was set high above the post with spokes that would flex, but the column was still rigid. In 1968, United States regulations (FMVSS Standard No. 204) were implemented concerning the acceptable rearward movement of the steering wheel in case of crash. Collapsible steering columns were required to meet that standard.  Before this invention, the Citroën DS incorporated a curved and off-center single spoke steering wheel designed to deflect the driver away from the steering column in case of a crash.

Power steering gives the driver an easier means by which the steering of a car can be accomplished. Modern power steering has almost universally relied on a hydraulic system, although electrical systems are steadily replacing this technology. Mechanical power steering systems were introduced, such as on 1953 Studebakers. However, hydraulically assisted systems have prevailed.

While other methods of steering passenger cars have resulted from experiments, for example the "wrist-twist" steering of the 1965 Mercury Park Lane concept car was controlled by two  rings, none have yet been deployed as successfully as the conventional large steering wheel.

Passenger automobile regulations implemented by the U.S. Department of Transportation required the locking of steering wheel rotation (or transmission locked in "park") to hinder motor vehicle theft; in most vehicles, this is accomplished when the ignition key is removed from the ignition lock. See steering lock.

Other designs

The driver's seat, and therefore the steering wheel, is centrally located on certain high-performance sports cars, such as the McLaren F1, and in the majority of single-seat racing cars.

As drivers may have their hands on the steering wheel for hours at a time these are designed with ergonomics in mind. However, the most important concern is that the driver can effectively convey torque to the steering system; this is especially important in vehicles without power steering or in the rare event of a loss of steering assist. A typical design for circular steering wheels is a steel or magnesium rim with a plastic or rubberized grip molded over and around it. Some drivers purchase vinyl or textile steering wheel covers to enhance grip or comfort, or simply as decoration. Another device used to make steering easier is the brodie knob.

A similar device in aircraft is the yoke. Water vessels not steered from a stern-mounted tiller are directed with the ship's wheel, which may have inspired the concept of the steering wheel. The steering wheel is better than other user interfaces and has persisted because driving requires precise feedback that only comes from a large interface.

Early Formula One cars used steering wheels taken directly from road cars. They were normally made from wood (necessitating the use of driving gloves), and in the absence of packaging constraints, they tended to be made as large a diameter as possible, to reduce the effort needed to turn. As cars grew progressively lower and cockpits narrower throughout the 1960s and 1970s, steering wheels became smaller, so as to fit into the more compact space available.

Spokes in steering wheel

The number of spokes in the steering wheel has continuously changed. Most early cars had four-spoke steering wheels.

A Banjo steering wheel was an option in early automobiles. They predate power steering. The wire spokes were a buffer or absorber between the driver's hands and the drum of the road. Most were 3- or 4-spokes made of four or five wires in each spoke, hence the name "Banjo".

Adjustable steering wheels

Tilt wheel
The original tilt wheel was developed by Edward James Lobdell in the early 1900s. A 7-position tilt wheel was introduced by the Saginaw Division of General Motors in 1963 for all passenger car divisions except Chevrolet which received the tilt wheel in 1964. This tilt wheel was also supplied to the other US automakers (except Ford). Originally a luxury option on cars, the tilt function helps to adjust the steering wheel by moving the wheel through an arc in an up and down motion. Tilt Steering Wheels rely upon a ratchet joint located in the steering column just below the steering wheel. By disengaging the ratchet lock, the wheel can be adjusted upward or downward while the steering column remains stationary below the joint. Some designs place the pivot slightly forward along the column, allowing for a fair amount of vertical movement of the steering wheel with little actual tilt, while other designs place the pivot almost inside the steering wheel, allowing adjustment of the angle of the steering wheel with almost no change in its height.

Adjustable steering column
In contrast, an adjustable steering column allows steering wheel height to be adjusted with only a small, useful change in tilt. Most of these systems work with compression locks or electric motors instead of ratchet mechanisms; the latter may be capable of moving to a memorized position when a given driver uses the car, or of moving up and forward for entry or exit.

Telescope wheel
Many pre-war British cars offered telescoping steering wheels that required loosening a locknut prior to adjustment, many using the Douglas ASW (Adjustable Steering Wheel). In 1949, the Jaguar XK120 introduced a new steering wheel supplied by Bluemel that was driver-adjustable by simply loosening a sleeve around the column by hand. A patent was filed regarding a telescoping steering wheel in July 1942 by Bernard Maurer of the Saginaw Steering Gear Division of General Motors (now Nexteer Automotive), but GM would not offer a telescoping wheel of their own until the debut of the optional telescopic wheel offered on the 1965 Corvette and Corvair, and the optional tilt/telescope wheel on 1965 Cadillacs. The GM column was released by twisting a locking ring surrounding the center hub, and offered a  range of adjustment.

Swing-away steering wheel
Introduced on the 1961 Ford Thunderbird, and made available on other Ford products throughout the 1960s, the Swing-away steering wheel allowed the steering wheel to move  to the right when the transmission selector was in Park, so as to make driver exit and entry easier.

Tilt-away steering wheel
Introduced by Ford in 1967 after updates to Federal Motor Vehicle Safety Standards requirements. Though it was an update to the swing-away steering wheel, which did not meet updated safety standards, it offers limited movement but added convenience due to the automatic pop-over function over its predecessor.

Quick release hub steering wheel
Some steering wheels can be mounted on a detachable hub a.k.a. a quick-release hub. The steering wheel can then be removed without the use of tools, simply by pressing a button. The system is much used in narrow-spaced racing cars, to facilitate the driver getting in and out, and in other cars as well, as an anti-theft device. The quick-release connector is often brand-specific, with some makes being interchangeable. The most common mounting pattern is 6×70 mm, which denotes a bolt circle pattern with six bolts placed along a circle 70 mm in diameter. Other examples of common bolt patterns are 3×, 5×, 6×74 mm and 6×. The quick release itself is often proprietary.

Usage
The steering wheel should be used with strategic movements of the hand and wrist in spinning motions. Caution and care should be used to ensure the safety of the extremities. The constant motions used must be performed with caution. "Proper posture of the hand-arm system while using hand tools is very important. As a rule, the wrist should not be bent, but must be kept straight to avoid overexertion of such tissues like tendons and tendon sheaths and compression of nerves and blood vessels."

The act of turning the steering wheel while the vehicle is stationary is called dry steering. It is generally advised to avoid dry steering as it puts a strain on the steering mechanism and causes undue wear of the tires.

Buttons and controls on the steering wheel

The first button added to the steering wheel was a switch to activate the car's electric horn. Traditionally located on the steering wheel hub or center pad, the horn switch was sometimes placed on the spokes or activated via a decorative horn ring which obviated the necessity to move a hand away from the rim. Electrical connections are made via a slip ring. A further development, the Rim Blow steering wheel, integrated the horn switch into the steering wheel rim.

In 1966, Ford offered the Highway Pilot Speed Control Option, with steering wheel pad-mounted rocker switches, on its Thunderbird. Uniquely, the Thunderbird also lightly applied the brakes and illuminated the stop lamps when the Retard was continuously depressed with the cruise control on, but not engaged.

In 1974, Lincoln added two rocker switches on the steering wheel to activate various cruise control functions on the Continental and Continental Mark IV. In 1988, Pontiac offered a steering wheel with 12 buttons controlling various audio functions on the Trans-Am, 6000 STE and Bonneville. 

In the 1990s, a proliferation of new buttons began to appear on automobile steering wheels. Remote or alternate adjustments could include vehicle audio, telephone, and voice control navigation. Often scroll wheels or buttons are used to set volume levels or page through menus, change radio stations or audio tracks. These controls can use universal interfaces, wired or wirelessly.

Gaming imitations

Game controllers are available for arcade cabinets, personal computers, and console games that are designed to look and feel like a steering wheel and intended for use in racing games. The least expensive units are paddle controllers with a larger wheel, but many gaming wheels also employ force feedback to simulate the tactile feedback a real driver feels from a steering wheel.

See also
Dry steering
Left- and right-hand traffic
 Remote control

References

External links

1898 introductions
Auto parts
Control devices
Human–machine interaction